Skelwith Bridge is a small village in the southern area of the Lake District in Cumbria, England. Historically, Skelwith Bridge is part of Westmorland, lying on the ancient boundary with Lancashire. The civil parish is called Skelwith. Its population at the 2011 census was 155.  It is located around 3 miles south of Grasmere and is nearby the waterfalls of Skelwith Force and Colwith Force. The nearest lakes to the village are Elter Water to the north-west and Loughrigg Tarn to the north.

See also

Listed buildings in Skelwith

References

External links

 Cumbria County History Trust: Hawkshead and Monk Coniston with Skelwith (nb: provisional research only – see Talk page)

Villages in Cumbria
South Lakeland District